is a consumer electronics retailer chain, based in Hiroshima, Japan. The company operated until September 30, 2009; the company changed its name to EDION WEST Corporation on October 1, 2009.

History
The company was established in 1947 as Daiichi Sangyo Kabushiki-gaisha, becoming known as "Daiichi" in Hiroshima.

They changed their store name to "Daiichi" in 1977 and the company name was renamed to "Kabushiki-gaisha Daiichi" in 1986.

In 1997 they adopted the name "DEODEO" and moved their head office from Hiroshima to Hatsukaichi, Hiroshima. At the same time, all store names were changed to Deodeo.

The company founded EDION Group jointly with Eiden Corporation (based in Nagoya), MIDORI DENKA Corporation (based in Amagasaki) and Kurashino Design,Inc. (based in Tokyo) in 2002. On October 1, 2009, the company name changed to EDION WEST Corporation by absorbing and merging Midori Denka. Since then, "Deodeo" has become a store brand.

Stores
Flagship is in Kamiya-cho, Naka-ku, Hiroshima.
91 stores in Chūgoku region (Hiroshima, Okayama, Yamaguchi, Shimane and Tottori).
21 stores in Shikoku (Ehime, Kagawa, Tokushima and Kōchi).
28 stores in Kyūshū and Okinawa (Fukuoka, Kagoshima, Kumamoto, Miyazaki, Nagasaki, Oita, Saga and Okinawa).
2 stores in Tōkai region (Mie and Gifu).
6 stores in Kantō region (Gunma, Saitama, Tokyo and Kanagawa).

Sports sponsorships
DEODEO Athletic Club for Women
Midori Fumoto
Takako Kotorida
Sanfrecce Hiroshima

References

External links 
DEODEO
edion Group

Consumer electronics retailers of Japan
Companies based in Hiroshima
Retail companies established in 1947
Retail companies disestablished in 2010